The Richest Girl in the World is a 1934 romantic comedy film directed by William A. Seiter and starring Miriam Hopkins and Joel McCrea. Norman Krasna was nominated for the Academy Award for Best Story. It was remade in 1944 as Bride by Mistake with Laraine Day and Alan Marshal.

Plot
When the  sinks, infant Dorothy Hunter (Miriam Hopkins) is orphaned, but inherits a fortune. She is brought up by John Connors (Henry Stephenson), whose wife was also lost in the disaster. He goes to such great lengths to protect her privacy that, though she has grown into adulthood and acquired the title of the richest girl in the world, the newspapers do not have an up-to-date photograph of her. She returns to America, but asks her friend and secretary, Sylvia Lockwood (Fay Wray), to impersonate her in a meeting with the managers of her trust fund, who also do not know what she looks like.

After seeing how happy Sylvia is with her new husband, Phillip (Reginald Denny), she broaches the topic of setting a wedding date with Donald (George Meeker), her longtime fiancé. He is forced to admit that he has fallen in love with someone else and was getting up the nerve to tell her. Since she is not the least bit in love, she congratulates him. However, it is too late to cancel the party in which she had planned to announce their wedding.

At the party, Dorothy and Sylvia continue pretending to be each other. Dorothy meets Anthony "Tony" Travers (Joel McCrea) and, after winning $60 from him playing carom billiards, takes a great liking to him. However, stung by Donald's confession that he was never sure if he was attracted to her or her money, Dorothy decides to see if Tony would prefer her to the woman Tony thinks is her. She does all in her power to encourage him to court "Dorothy", even lending him money to do so. Connors warns her that she is being foolish, that no man could resist choosing such a seemingly wealthy and beautiful woman, but Dorothy is adamant. Sylvia and Phillip reluctantly play along.

Tony is invited to a weekend retreat. Connors, Sylvia, and Phillip arrive a day late, using the bad weather as an excuse to give Dorothy time alone (except for the servants) with Tony. By this point, Dorothy is deeply in love. Tony tells her how much he likes her, but then adds that the richest girl in the world "wouldn't have him anyway". Unable to bear being his second choice, she tells him that he would probably succeed if he proposed, so he does. Sylvia, having been forewarned by Dorothy, accepts him.

That night, however, Tony sees Phillip sneaking into Sylvia's room. The next morning, he breaks the engagement. Dorothy claims that Phillip came into her bedroom, putting Tony to the ultimate test. When Phillip shows up for breakfast exceptionally pleased with himself, Tony punches him. Then, finally realizing who he really loves, he picks Dorothy up and carries her off to get married, still not knowing her true identity, and in spite of what he believes she did the night before.

Cast
 Miriam Hopkins as Dorothy Hunter 
 Joel McCrea as  Anthony "Tony" Travers 
 Fay Wray as Sylvia Lockwood 
 Henry Stephenson as Jonathan "John" Connors 
 Reginald Denny as Phillip Lockwood 
 Beryl Mercer as Marie, Dorothy's Maid 
 George Meeker as Donald 
 Wade Boteler as Jim Franey 
 Herbert Bunston as Dean Cavandish, Chief Trustee 
 Burr McIntosh as David Preston 
 Edgar Norton as Binkley, Dorothy's Butler

Production
Pandro S. Berman produced the film personally while being production head of RKO. He bought the script with his own money when Norman Krasna was being blackballed by Louis B. Mayer at MGM.

References

External links 
 
 
 
 

1934 films
1934 romantic comedy films
American black-and-white films
American romantic comedy films
1930s English-language films
Films directed by William A. Seiter
Films scored by Max Steiner
Films set in 1934
RKO Pictures films
1930s American films